Half a Truth is a 1922 British silent crime film directed by Sinclair Hill and starring Margaret Hope, Lawford Davidson and Miles Mander. It was based on a 1911 novel by Eliza Humphreys writing as Rita.

Cast
 Margaret Hope as Virginia  
 Lawford Davidson as Chris Kennaway 
 Miles Mander as Marquis Sallast  
 Norma Whalley as Lady Lucille Altamont  
 Irene Rooke as Octavia Madison  
 Percy Standing as Sir Richard Madison 
 Phillip Simmons as Barry Connell  
 Stella Wood-Sims as Doreen Madison

References

Bibliography
 Murphy, Robert. Directors in British and Irish Cinema: A Reference Companion. BFI, 2006.

External links

1922 films
1922 crime films
British silent feature films
British crime films
Films directed by Sinclair Hill
Films based on British novels
Stoll Pictures films
Films shot at Cricklewood Studios
British black-and-white films
1920s English-language films
1920s British films
Silent crime films